Founded in 1862, the University of Pennsylvania Glee Club (Penn Glee Club) is one of the oldest continually running glee clubs in the United States and the oldest performing arts group at the University of Pennsylvania. The Club draws its singing members from the undergraduate and graduate populations of the University of Pennsylvania; individuals from the Penn community are also called upon to fill roles in the band and technical staff when the Club puts on theatrical productions. The club, known for its eclectic mix of Penn standards, Broadway classics, classical favorites, and pop hits, has traveled to over 40 countries and territories on five continents. After directing the Glee Club for 44 years, Bruce Montgomery stepped down as director in 2000 and was replaced by former Glee Club member C. Erik Nordgren. After 15 years of dedicated service to the group, Nordgren stepped down and was succeeded by Joshua Glassman. After three years at the podium Joshua Glassman stepped down, passing the baton to Club alumnus Daniel Carsello. As of April 9, 2021, the Penn Glee Club accepts singers of all genders.

History

The Glee Club's history began modestly in 1862 when eight undergraduate men formed what is now the oldest performing arts group at the University of Pennsylvania; subsequently, another eight men were added to the group. The Glee Club's premiere performance was in the chapel of Collegiate Hall at Ninth & Chestnut Streets in Philadelphia for "an audience that was unusually select and large, the Hall filled to its utmost capacity". At this concert, each man wore red and blue ribbons in his buttonhole, thus becoming the first known Penn group to wear the university colors as part of its uniform.

The Glee Club quickly became a part of campus life, singing at football rallies, basketball games, alumni events, and chapel services. Soon, much of the university's musical demands depended upon the Glee Club. As a result, the reliance on such traditional collegiate songs such as Gaudeamus Igitur and Integer Vitae gave way to original pieces composed especially for the university and the Glee Club which themselves became traditions: "The Red and Blue," "Afterglow," and "Fight On, Pennsylvania."

The Glee Club began to have more of a regional and national presence in the early decades of the Twentieth Century. In 1910, it embarked on a brief tour of the New England states. In 1915, the club sang at the U.S. Naval Academy. In 1926, the Glee Club performed for President Calvin Coolidge in the White House. In 1928, listeners could hear the club as far west as Nebraska in a broadcast publicizing the newly formed CBS Radio Network.

In 1934, under director Harl McDonald, the Penn Glee Club began performing with the Philadelphia Orchestra. The club's partnership with this symphony came to include a 1938 performance of the Brahms' Alto Rhapsody with Marian Anderson and the 1970 world premiere broadcast of then-Director Bruce 'Monty' Montgomery's Herodotus Fragments. The 1950s saw the first of many Glee Club appearances on national television with such celebrities as Ed McMahon and Carol Lawrence. The club has been showcased on television specials, in the Macy's Thanksgiving Day Parade, and at professional sporting events. The Philadelphia Phillies had the Club sing the National Anthem at the 1993 National League Championship Series. In 1976, the Penn Glee Club first performed with the Boston Pops. The club has also shared the stage with such superstars as Bob Hope, Frank Sinatra, Jimmy Stewart, Grace Kelly, and Bill Cosby.

The Penn Glee Club stepped out of the formal lines of choral performance in 1928, performing its first fully staged production, Hades, Inc., written by then-director H. Alexander Matthews. Staging became standard fare for the modern Club with 1969/1970's Handel With Hair. Each year, the Club writes and produces a fully staged, Broadway-style production, highlighting choral singing, clever plots and dialogue, dancing, humor, colorful sets and costumes, and a pit band.

The Penn Glee Club has toured internationally since 1959 and has traveled to nearly all 50 states in the United States and 37 nations and territories on five continents.
Since its first performance at the White House for President Calvin Coolidge in 1926, the club has sung for numerous heads of state and world leaders. One of the highlights of 1989 was the club's performance for Polish President Lech Wałęsa. In 1999, several prominent Japanese executives sponsored a tour to Guam and Japan, the club's first tour of the Asian Pacific. In 2004, the Club returned to Asia, this time touring China, Hong Kong, Taiwan and Singapore. The following year, in 2005, the Club journeyed back to South America for the first time since 1987, touring Argentina and Uruguay. The 2006–2007 season saw the group traveling to Ireland and Northern Ireland for the first time. In the summer of 2009, the Club toured Colombia, Panama, and Costa Rica.

In 2021, following several years of discussion and nearly a year of careful deliberation, the Penn Glee Club voted to merge with its sister group, the Penn Sirens, and to remove the gender restriction on singing membership. The club now features an SATB choir, SSAA and TTBB chamber choirs, and two student-run a cappella groups, the Penn Pipers and Penn Sirens.

Directors
Daniel Carsello, 2018–Present
Joshua Glassman, 2015–2018
C. Erik Nordgren, 2000–2015
Bruce Montgomery, 1956–2000
Robert Godsall, early 1950s
Harl McDonald, 1940s.
Burton True Scales, 1930s
H. Alexander Matthews, 1920s
Frederick Brooke Neilson, 1890–92
Joseph Spencer Brock, mid-1880s
Hugh Alexander Clarke, c. 1880–mid-1880s
Robert Neilson, c. 1869–c. 1871
Francis Ashhurst, c. 1865–c.1868
T.B. Bishop, c. 1862–c.1864

International tours
For over five decades, the University of Pennsylvania Glee Club has made an international name for itself, having toured in over 45 countries and territories on 5 continents. The following is a complete list of the foreign lands to which the Glee Club has traveled:

 1959: Puerto Rico
 1968: Canada
 1969: Ecuador, Peru, Panama
 1971: Belgium, Bulgaria, Denmark, England, Finland, Netherlands, Soviet Union, Yugoslavia
 1983: West Germany, Denmark
 1984: Puerto Rico
 1985: Greece
 1986: England, Scotland
 1987: Jamaica, Peru
 1989: Mexico
 1990: Austria, Belgium, Czechoslovakia, Hungary
 1992: Israel
 1995: Austria, Czech Republic, Slovakia
 1997: Spain, Gibraltar, Morocco
 1999: Guam, Japan
 2001: Mexico
 2002: Canada
 2004: China, Hong Kong, Singapore, Taiwan
 2005: Argentina, Uruguay
 2007: Ireland, Northern Ireland
 2009: Colombia, Panama, Costa Rica
 2011: Sweden, Norway, Iceland
 2012: Bermuda, Canada
 2014: Qatar, Tanzania, United Arab Emirates
 2015: Austria, Czech Republic, Germany
 2017: Singapore, Thailand
 2018: Canada
 2019: China, Hong Kong, Macau, Taiwan, Japan
 2022: Spain, Monaco, France

Award of Merit recipients

Established in 1964 "to bring a declaration of appreciation to an individual each year that has made a significant contribution to the world of music and helped to create a climate in which our talents may find valid expression."

Randall Thompson - May 2, 1964
Robert Shaw - February 26, 1965
Marshall Bartholomew - February 26, 1967
William L. Dawson - February 25, 1968
Leopold Stokowski - February 24, 1969
Elaine Brown - February 24, 1969
Gaylord P. Harnwell - May 15, 1970
Aaron Copland - December 5, 1970
Sol Hurok - December 4, 1971
Eugene Ormandy - December 15, 1972
Marian Anderson - October 20, 1973
Samuel Barber - October 19, 1974
Burl Ives - October 25, 1975
Arthur Fiedler - October 23, 1976
Risë Stevens - October 22, 1977
Leonard De Paur - October 28, 1978
Paul Hume - October 20, 1979
Robert Merrill - February 16, 1981
Bruce Montgomery - February 21, 1981
Vincent Persichetti - May 19, 1984
Sheldon Harnick - May 16, 1992

Honorary members
Over the years, certain individuals have shown particular devotion to and support of the Glee Club well beyond the norm. When such exceptional fealty is repeatedly demonstrated, the Club occasionally recognizes such support with Honorary Membership.

1968 - E. Brooks Lilly
1968 - Charles H. Cox III
1969 - Santiago Friele
1976 - Edward F. Lane
1978 - Stepen Goff
1983 - Michael T. Huber
1987 - William Kelley
1987 - Steven Aurand
1990 - Nicholas Constan
1990 - E. Craig Sweeten
1990 - Claude White
1991 - Ray Evans
1991 - Jay Livingston
1995 - Rev. Stanley Johnson
1995 - Timothy J. Alston
2004 - Paul Liou
2012 - Elizabeth Thomas & Nick Thomas

The Penn Pipers
The Penn Pipers, a subset of the Glee Club, formed in 1950, making it by far the oldest existing a cappella group at the University of Pennsylvania. Its founding student leaders created unique arrangements emulating the close, contemporary harmonies of a popular, jazz-oriented quartet called The Hi-Los. The Pipers' most popular tune of the time—a lush setting of Brahm's Lullaby arranged by member Bill Tost—became its standard closing number for many years. The group has always been a subset of the University of Pennsylvania Glee Club and serves as an opportunity for some of the Glee Club's singers to perform music of a lighter and more popular style.

The group performs barbershop music and doo-wop,. Its current repertoire encompasses popular music from the 1890s through to the present day.

The Penn Glee Club Band 
The Penn Glee Club Band is the Glee Club's pit band. As its own ensemble, the band performs on its own as well. The band was formed in 2012 as an integral part of the larger Club's annual fall and spring shows. In addition to performing in the fall and spring shows, the Penn Glee Club Band also performs its own gigs, both on campus and around the city. Despite being only a few years old, the Penn Glee Club Band has already made a name for itself. It has performed at Spring Fling, an annual Penn tradition, and has also filmed a music video.

References

Sources

External links

The University of Pennsylvania Glee Club
The Penn Pipers
The Penn Sirens

1862 establishments in Pennsylvania
Choirs in Pennsylvania
Penn
Musical groups established in 1862
Pennsylvania
Glee Club